Pavel Cipriano Caicedo Renteria (born June 15, 1977) is an Ecuadorian football defender who most recently played for Macará.

Club career
He was deemed surplus to requirements at Macará in May 2013.

References

External links
FEF Player Card

1977 births
Living people
Sportspeople from Guayaquil
Association football defenders
Ecuadorian footballers
C.S. Emelec footballers
C.D. El Nacional footballers
S.D. Quito footballers
Barcelona S.C. footballers
C.S.D. Macará footballers
Ecuadorian Serie A players